Bodini is an Italian surname. Notable people with the surname include:

Daniele Bodini (born 1945), Italian-American businessman
Luciano Bodini (born 1954), Italian footballer
Marco Bruno Bodini (born 1972), Italian sailor
Renato Bodini (1909–1974), Italian footballer and coach

See also
Bodin (surname)

Italian-language surnames